Gujarat College Ground is a multi purpose stadium in Ahmedabad, Gujarat. The ground is mainly used for organizing matches of cricket, football and other sports.  The stadium hosted eleven first-class matches between 1935 and 1959, mostly  as the home ground for the Gujarat cricket team. The first match was held on February 2–4, 1935, where Gujarat and Bombay played to a draw.

References

External links
 cricketarchive
 cricinfo

Sports venues in Ahmedabad
Cricket grounds in Gujarat
Sports venues completed in 1935
1935 establishments in India
20th-century architecture in India